Edgemont is a residential neighbourhood in northwest Calgary, Alberta, Canada, and is located north of the community of Dalhousie. It is also bounded by John Laurie Boulevard to the south, Sarcee Trail to the west, Country Hills Boulevard to the north, and Shaganappi Trail to the east.

Much of Edgemont is a northwest extension of Nose Hill, as evidenced by the steep escarpments at the southeast end of the community. The elevated position of Edgemont (1245m at its highest) provides views of the city to the south and the Rocky Mountains to the west.

The community began development in 1978, and was recently completed. It is represented in the Calgary City Council by the Ward 4 councillor.

Demographics

According to statistics from 2000, residents in this community had a median household income of $88,442, and there was 8.6% low income residents living in the neighbourhood. As of 2000, 33.9% of the residents were immigrants. A proportion of 5.8% of the buildings were condominiums or apartments, and 11.1% of the housing was used for renting.

Edgemont is divided in subareas: from oldest to newest, the subareas are Edgemont Estates, Edgedale, Edenwold, Edgepark, Edgevalley, Edgebrook, and Edgeridge.

Education
As of 2010, there were three schools in the district: Edgemont Elementary School; Tom Baines Junior High School (public system); and Mother Mary Greene Elementary School in (Catholic). Students in Edgemont continue onto Sir Winston Churchill High School in the public system, or St. Francis High School in the Catholic system.

See also
List of neighbourhoods in Calgary

References

External links

Edgemont Community Association Info Site
Edgemont Community Association

Neighbourhoods in Calgary